Balcarce Partido is a  partido of Buenos Aires Province in Argentina.

Name
The partido is named after Antonio González de Balcarce (1774-1819), an Argentine military commander, governor of Buenos Aires and Supreme Director (president) of Argentina in 1816.

Economy
The economy of Balcarce Partido is dominated by agriculture. Other economic activities include mineral extraction and tourism.

Farming is dominated by the production of arable crops and potatoes.

The impact of modern farming techniques and mining has damaged the natural habitats of indigenous species such as  emu, jackrabbit, viscacha and armadillo.

Balcarce is home to Argentina's National Institute of Agricultural Technology, Instituto Nacional de Tecnología Agropecuaria (INTA) and the faculty of agrarian sciences, Facultad de Ciencias Agrarias de la Universidad Nacional de Mar del Plata.

Attractions
 Autódromo Juan Manuel Fangio
 Juan Manuel Fangio Museum

Settlements
 Balcarce
 San Agustín
 Los Pinos
 Napaleofú
 Bosch
 Ramos Otero
 Villa Laguna La Brava.

External links
 Juan Manuel Fangio museum (English content)
 Municipality website
 National Institute of Agricultural Technology website
 Faculty of agrarian sciences website
 El Semanal newspaper 

1865 establishments in Argentina
Partidos of Buenos Aires Province